Mohammed Hanif Khan Shastri was an Indian Sanskrit scholar. He is winner of National Communal Harmony Award, in the individual category for the year 2009. The Government of India awarded him fourth highest civilian award Padma Shri (Literature & Education) in 2019. He has been professor at Rashtriya Sanskrit Sansthan.

Died on 26 January 2020.He worked with a great enthusiasm in his last days, but due to prolonged illnesses and suffering from a weak body. He will be greatly remembered for his contribution in the field of religious literature.

Early life 
Khan Shastri was born in district Sonbhadra of Uttar Pradesh. In an interview to Doordarshan, he informs that he was the first of his family to pass 5th standard and thus the environment was not academically inclined. On his failure in high school, his teacher Pundit Ratanlal Shastri, urged him to study one chapter of the Bhagavad Gita every day, which would ensure god's benevolence and thus put an end to all his troubles. This exposure to the Bhagwad Gita, instilled in him a sense of curiosity about the secrets in the text, and the desire to share them with others. This desire led him to attempt to excel in Sanskrit, without which he couldn't see fruition of his goal of unravelling Bhagwad Gita's secrets.

Academics 
Khan Shastri has a MA in Sanskrit, subsequently he studied Puranas under Sampoorna Anand in Varanasi, and gained the degree of Acharya and Shastri and also a doctorate in Comparative Religion. His doctoral thesis was Mahamantra Gayatri Aur Surah Fatiah Ka Arth Prayog Evam Mahatmya Ki Drishtri Se Tulnatmak Adhyayan (Comparative analysis of Gayatri Mantra and Surah Fatiah, with reference to meaning and importance).

Books 
Amongst the eight books he has written are:
 Mohangita, 
 Geeta Aur Quran men Samanjasya
 Ved aur Quran se Mahamantra Gayatri aur Surah Fatiha
 Vedon men Manav Adhikar
 Meljol.
 Mahamantra gayatree ka baudhik upyog
 Shreemadbhagwadgeeta aur quran
 Vishwabandhutva ka pratyachh pramad

References 

Year of birth missing (living people)
Living people
Sanskrit scholars from Uttar Pradesh
Recipients of the Padma Shri in literature & education